WNTT (1250 AM) was a radio station broadcasting a mostly mixed country music format. Licensed to Tazewell, Tennessee, United States, the station was last owned by WNTT, Inc. and featured local programming on a 24/7 schedule. WNTT's owners surrendered its license to the Federal Communications Commission on October 20, 2022, and the license was cancelled on October 27, 2022.

References

External links
FCC Station Search Details: DWNTT {Facility ID: 73351)
FCC History Cards for WNTT (covering 1958-1979) 

Defunct radio stations in the United States
NTT
Claiborne County, Tennessee
Radio stations established in 1960
1960 establishments in Tennessee
Radio stations disestablished in 2022
2022 disestablishments in Tennessee
NTT